Censorship in Finland refers to government policies in controlling and regulating certain information.

History 
In 1686, the office of Censor of Books, which was to monitor literature imported and published in Finland, was established. Publishers had to get approval for their books.

In the 19th century, the censors attacked the press. Several newspapers were stopped soon after they came out.

In 1829, a law was made about censorship, which heavily increased the censorship. The law was in place until 1865. A committee was made to take care of it. Its president was the deputy chancellor of the university.

Locations
During World War I, Russian censorship was carried out in the following cities: Helsinki, Tornio, Kuopio, Vaasa, Pori, Tampere, Turku, Rauma, Oulu and Viipuri.

During the era of Russification in Finland, several Finnish newspapers were taken out of print.

During the Second World War, a government agency was founded to administer censorship.

After the Second World War
In the immediate aftermath of the Continuation War, a number of books were withdrawn from public libraries because of Soviet pressure. This ban concerned mostly pre-war and wartime propaganda works which were considered anti-Soviet, but the books remained in free circulation in the second-hand market. In 1958, the memoirs Kommunisti sisäministerinä (“Communist as the Minister of Interior”) of former communist Minister of Interior Affairs Yrjö Leino were withdrawn from circulation and burned just before publication on Soviet demand. The book was republished in 1991.

During the period of Finlandization, major Finnish publishers tended to avoid books that were thought to risk Soviet displeasure. For example, the first volume of the Finnish translation of Aleksander Solzhenitsyn’s The Gulag Archipelago was published in Sweden, and the remaining two volumes by a minor Finnish publisher.

Modern day

Film
Film censorship carried out by the government agency Finnish Board of Film Classification was abolished in 2001. However, the agency still rates all movies sold in Finland.

Internet

In 2006, a new copyright law known as Lex Karpela set some restrictions on publishing information regarding copy protection schemes.

Also in 2006, the government started Internet censorship by delivering Finnish ISPs a secret blocking list maintained by Finnish police. Implementation of the block was voluntary, but some ISPs implemented it. The list was supposed to contain only sites with child pornography, but ended up also blocking, among others, the site lapsiporno.info that criticized the move towards censorship and listed sites that were noticed to have been blocked.

Following a “voluntary law”  enacted by Finnish parliament on 1 January 2007, most of the Finland’s major Internet service providers decided on 22 November 2006 to begin filtering child pornography, and ISPs first started filtering in January 2008. The Ministry of Communications has commented that filtering is voluntary for ISPs as long as they do not refuse. The blacklist is provided by Finnish police and should contain only foreign sites. Technically filtering was planned to be URI based, like the United Kingdom’s Cleanfeed, but so far implementations have been DNS based.

A majority of these censored Internet sites, however, do not actually seem to be censored by the Finnish ISPs due to actual child pornography, but due to “normal” adult pornography instead. Most of the known sites are also located in EU or United States where child pornography is strictly illegal anyway. Two-thirds of the Finnish Internet censorship list of the filtered domains were collected on lapsiporno.info, the homepage of Matti Nikki, a Finnish activist criticizing Internet censorship in the European Union and especially in Finland. On 12 February 2008, Nikki’s page was also added to the National Bureau of Investigation’s blacklist (Wikinews article). As the list was compiled using links from pornography sites, this list does not tell anything about the last third of the blocked sites.

At September 2008, problems with accuracy continued, when the website of the main international standards organization for the World Wide Web W3C was briefly blacklisted as childporn by mistake.

In 2008, a government-sponsored report considered establishing similar filtering in order to curb online gambling.

After investigation of complaints about how the law on filtering child pornography has been implemented and the actions of the police, the vice Parliamentary Ombudsman concluded on 29 May 2009 that the police had followed the law and that most sites on the list did have material that could be classified as child pornography at the time they were investigated by the police. He also found that the law is somewhat unclear and that its effect on free speech is problematic and recommends these matters be considered when the law is overseen.

The Pirate Bay 
In 2012, internet service providers Elisa, Sonera (now Telia) and DNA were ordered by Finnish courts to block traffic to The Pirate Bay and put Internet filters on the specific website.

Press
The Finnish press currently enjoys extensive freedom. Reporters Without Borders' (RWB) annual Press Freedom Index listed Finland as the country with the freest press for six years in a row between 2010 and 2016. In 2017, Finland fell to third place following an incident dubbed "Sipilägate": Prime Minister Juha Sipilä had pressured the national broadcaster Yle when it had covered a possible conflict of interests concerning him. RWB Secretary General Christophe Deloire cited Finland losing the first place as the most important development in press freedom surveyed by the Index that year.

See also
 Media of Finland

References

External links

Five years of censorship at Lapsiporno.info
Russian Censorship in Finland during WW1